is a shooter game for the Super NES, developed and published by Irem in 1991. It is a partial port of R-Type II, borrowing stages and enemies, but introducing several of its own. The game has been re-released on the Wii Virtual Console in Japan, North America and PAL regions in 2008.

Gameplay
Super R-Type borrows four stages from R-Type II and adds three new ones. The game is known for its high difficulty (even compared to other games in the series), particularly because of its lack of checkpoints, since dying means restarting the level from scratch. Also, this game suffers from slowdown, which was also a problem in many early games for this system. But unlike the others Super R-Type slows down to a virtual standstill when there are many things on-screen. However, this proved useful for players when there were many obstacles on-screen because it was easier to avoid them.

Reception

Entertainment Weekly picked the game as the #2 greatest game available in 1991, saying: "The space-shooting R-Type game has been evolving over the last several years; this latest incarnation is the most graphically overpowering yet. Players pilot a ship through the deep cosmos, picking up various supercharged weapons along the way and squaring off against some extraordinarily detailed aliens, which look like illustrations from classic pulp sci-fi magazines of the 1930s."

French gaming magazine  gave the game a score of 87%, praising the game's "magnificent" graphics and calling the ship's maneuverability "exemplary", they did however criticize the fact that the action "slowed down clearly when there are a lot of sprites on screen".

Super Gamer gave a review score of 74% stating: "It looks brilliant and plays well, but while graphical slowdown isn’t that bad, going back to the start of the level whenever you die soon becomes tedious."

Re-releases 
On March 14, 2008, the game was released on the Nintendo Wii Virtual Console service in Europe and Australia. The game was made available on the Virtual Console in North America on March 17, 2008. However, it was removed from the Virtual Console on March 30, 2012 in North America and on March 31, 2012 in Europe.

Notes

References

1991 video games
R-Type
Super Nintendo Entertainment System games
Video games developed in Japan
Video games scored by Hiroshi Kimura
Video games scored by Takushi Hiyamuta
Video games scored by Yasuhiro Kawakami
Video games set in the 22nd century
Virtual Console games
Irem games
Horizontally scrolling shooters
Science fiction video games
Single-player video games

ja:R-TYPE II#移殖版